Mesoscale meteorology is the study of weather systems smaller than synoptic-scale systems but larger than microscale and storm-scale cumulus systems. Examples of mesoscale weather systems are sea breezes, squall lines, and mesoscale convective complexes.

Vertical velocity often equals or exceeds horizontal velocities in mesoscale meteorological systems due to nonhydrostatic processes such as buoyant acceleration of a rising thermal or acceleration through a narrow mountain pass.

Subclasses
Mesoscale Meteorology is divided into these subclasses:

 Meso-alpha 200–2000 km scale of phenomena like fronts, squall lines, mesoscale convective systems (MCS), tropical cyclones at the edge of synoptic scale
 Meso-beta 20–200 km scale of phenomena like sea breezes, lake effect snow storms
 Meso-gamma 2–20 km scale of phenomena like thunderstorm convection, complex terrain flows (at the edge to microscale, also known as storm-scale)

As a note, tropical and subtropical cyclones are classified by National Hurricane Center as synoptic scale rather than mesoscale.

Mesoscale boundaries
As in synoptic frontal analysis, mesoscale analysis uses cold, warm, and occluded fronts on the mesoscale to help describe phenomena.  On weather maps mesoscale fronts are depicted as smaller and with twice as many bumps or spikes as the synoptic variety.  In the United States, opposition to the use of the mesoscale versions of fronts on weather analyses, has led to the use of an overarching symbol (a trough symbol) with a label of outflow boundary as the frontal notation.

See also
 Microscale meteorology
 Misoscale meteorology
 POLYGON experiment
 Surface weather analysis
 Synoptic scale meteorology

References